Grands Prix between 1940 and 1945 occurred during World War II and so were limited to a very small number of events.  There was no organised championship in these years. The majority of Grand Prix races during this period were run in America. The first post-war races were run in Paris on 9 September 1945, one week after the end of the war.

Wartime Grands Prix

1940–1942

1943–1944
No Grand Prix races held

1945

References

1940s